Battle of Hysiae can refer to:

 Battle of Hysiae (c.669 BC) between the Spartans and the Argives
 Battle of Hysiae (417 BC) between the Spartans and the Argive-Athenian alliance